Darwinism: An Exposition of the Theory of Natural Selection with Some of Its Applications is an 1889 book on evolution by Alfred Russel Wallace, the co-discoverer of evolution by natural selection together with Charles Darwin.  This was a book Wallace wrote as a defensive response to the scientific critics of natural selection. Of all Wallace's books, it is cited by scholarly publications the most.

Synopsis 

In Darwinism fifteen chapters, Alfred Russel Wallace sets out his understanding of the theory of evolution by natural selection. He begins by defining "species", discussing creationism, opinion before Charles Darwin, and Darwin's theory. He then describes the Malthusian struggle for existence, given the ability of organisms to reproduce in a world of finite resources. He explains the importance of variability within species, giving examples. He describes variation in domesticated animals and cultivated plants, and the process of artificial selection by breeders. Wallace then explains the process of natural selection acting on pre-existing variation. He lists various issues and objections to the theory. He discusses how interspecies hybrids are usually infertile, and how this can contribute to reproductive isolation. He then examines the purpose of animal coloration, including camouflage and mimicry, arguing that these are evidence of natural selection. He gives detailed examples of warning coloration and mimicry, discussing how these are produced by selection. Animal coloration and ornamentation that differs between the sexes are discussed, though he largely disagrees with Darwin's theory of sexual selection. Wallace then explores the co-evolution of flowers with their pollinators including insects and birds. He then describes the geographical distribution of organisms, arguing that this was created by long-distance dispersal of pioneer organisms, such as insects blown across the sea. He explains the geological evidence for evolution, the fossil record in successive layers of rock. He then examines objections to Darwinism concerning variation and heredity. Finally, he looks at how Darwinism may apply to humans.

Analysis 

In the preface to Darwinism, Wallace had used the term pure-Darwinism which proposed a "greater efficacy" for natural selection. The book is notable for defending August Weismann's theory of heredity and rejecting the inheritance of acquired characteristics and the concept of sexual selection which Darwin gave credence to. George Romanes dubbed this view as "Wallaceism", noting that in contrast to Darwin, this position was advocating a "pure theory of natural selection to the exclusion of any supplementary theory." The book is seen as laying the foundation for the neo-Darwinian theory of evolution.

References

Further reading
 Hutton, Frederick. (1900). New-Darwinism. Science 11: 588–589.
 Romanes, John George. (1889). Mr. Wallace on Darwinism. Science 14: 150–155.

External links 

 Darwinism: An Exposition of the Theory of Natural Selection with Some of Its Applications Online at Internet Archive.
 

1889 non-fiction books
1889 in science
Books about Charles Darwin
Darwinism
Evolutionary biology literature